Guytar-e Olya (also Romanized as Gūytar-e ‘Olyā) is a village in Birun Bashm Rural District, Kelardasht District, Chalus County, Mazandaran Province, Iran. At the 2006 census, its population was 474, in 120 families.

References 

Populated places in Chalus County